Private Property is a 2022 American thriller film directed by Chadd Harbold and starring Ashley Benson and Shiloh Fernandez.   It is a remake of the 1960 film of the same title.

Cast
Ashley Benson as Kathryn Carlyle
Shiloh Fernandez as Ben
Logan Miller as Oates 
Frank Whaley as Ed Hogate
Jay Pharoah as Richard
King Orba as The Mechanic

Production
Filming wrapped in Los Angeles in August 2021.

Release
The film was released in theaters and on demand and digital on May 13, 2022.

Reception
The film has a 13% rating on Rotten Tomatoes based on eight reviews.

References

External links
 
 

2022 films
American thriller films
2020s English-language films
Remakes of American films
Lionsgate films
2022 thriller films
2020s American films